WBRB is a Country formatted broadcast radio station licensed to Buckhannon, West Virginia, serving North Central West Virginia.  WBRB is owned and operated by West Virginia Radio Corporation.

References

External links
 101.3 The Bear Online
 

1990 establishments in West Virginia
BRB
Radio stations established in 1990
BRB